Samantabhadra (Lit. "All Good", or "Always Auspicious") may refer to:

 Samantabhadra (Bodhisattva), a bodhisattva in Mahayana Buddhism associated with practice and meditation
 Samantabhadra (Tibetan: Kuntu Zangpo), the name of a Buddha, the Adi-Buddha Samantabhadra, in Tibetan Buddhism
 Samantabhadra (Jain monk), second-century Digambara head of the monastic order
 Samantabhadra (Karmole) (1891–1988), Digambara monk
 Samantabhadra Meditation Sutra, a text teaching meditation and repentance practices